Annabelle Sethupathi is a 2021 Indian Tamil-language horror comedy film directed by Deepak Sundarrajan and produced by Sudhan Sundaram and G Jayaram under the banner of Passion Studios. The film stars Vijay Sethupathi, Taapsee Pannu, Jagapathi Babu and Yogi Babu. The film was released worldwide on Disney+ Hotstar on 17 September 2021. The film received unfavorable reviews from critics.

Plot 
In 1948,  Kadhiresan  visits a magnificent palace built by King Veera Sethupathi and wishes to own such a palace himself. In 1966, Kadhiresan's niece is possessed while cooking in the palace for her husband and daughter. Afterward, the family dies in their sleep and reunite with other family members who died in the palace. With them is Kadhiresan's dead cook, Shanmugam, who claims that a mysterious force compels him to poison the inhabitants of the palace every full moon, and that a person who survives the poisoning will set them free. Until then, the spirits, including Kadhiresan (who has become a recluse), are trapped in the palace.

In 2021, Rudra's family are thieves, feuding with two other thieves. The dispute lands them in front of police Inspector Kadhir, the great-great-grandson of Kadhiresan. Kadhir and his grandfather, Vikram, wish to sell the palace, but are stymied by rumours of the palace's haunting. Kadhir hires Rudra's family to supposedly clean the palace. In reality, he  wants them to live there until the full moon in order to prove that the palace is safe. Rudra's family agrees to clean the property, planning to loot the palace.

When Rudra first steps foot in the palace, the ghosts feel mysterious energy and hope that she can set them free. Rudra, who has been enchanted by the palace, plots with her family to fake a haunting so that they can acquire the palace cheaply. Kadhiresan's ghost, spooked after seeing Rudra, begins to secretly follow her around. On the day of the full moon, Rudra's family go to the temple, leaving Rudra behind. Shanmugam possesses Rudra's mother to cook for her. Rudra eats and falls asleep. Though she surives, when she wakes up, she is able to see the ghosts. After hearing their story, Rudra promises to free them, in return for them helping with her plan.

Shanmugam later takes Rudra to a secret room in the palace, which holds pictures from the 1940s of a woman resembling her. Shanmugam tells Rudra the story of Veera Sethupathi, who built the palace for his beloved queen, Annabelle. The two live happily, but Kadhiresan begins to covet their home . After Veera Sethupathi refuses to sell the palace, Kadhiresan poisons the couple. A pregnant Annabelle dies after swearing vengeance. This is secretly seen by the couple's cook, Shanmugam. After Kadhiresan and his extended family move into the palace, Shanmugam poisons their food. Kadhiresan suspects Shanmugam and forces him to eat first, which Shanmugam does without hesitation. By the next morning, Shanmugam, Kadhiresan and his family are all dead, except for Kadhiresan's grandson, Vikram, who had missed the meal. Since then, Shanmugam has been killing Kadhiresan's relatives who move into the palace. The sole survivors of the family are Vikram and Kadhir.

When Kadhir attempts to kick Rudra's family out of the palace, a mysterious force throws Kadhir and his goons out, surprising the ghosts who hadn't been able to interfere. Shanmugam fails to convince Rudra that she is the reincarnation of Annabelle. The ghosts overhear their conversation and are angry at Shanmugam's deceit. Kadhir and his goons return with Vikram, who believes thay Rudra is Annabelle. He decides to kill her to satisfy his grandfather's ghost. The ghosts of Kadhiresan's family acknowledge Rudra as the rightful owner of the palace and combine their powers to stop Vikram from hurting her. When a new arrival enters the palace, they once again feel the energy that accompanied Rudra's arrival, and finally at peace, disappear.

The new arrival, a government official resembling Veera Sethupathi, tells the assembled parties that the government will seize the palace as a heritage-listed tourism site. Rudra and her family depart in a huff. The government official, having fallen in love with Rudra at first sight, proposes to her. Rudra accepts with a smile. Shanmugam, watching their reunion, is finally at peace and disappears. Alone in the palace, Kadhiresan's ghost attempts to leave but is shocked to find that he is still trapped. The movie then returns to the scene where Kadhir and his goons were pushed out of the palace, hinting at a sequel to the story.

Cast 

 Vijay Sethupathi as King Veera Sethupathi and the government official
 Taapsee Pannu as Annabelle Sethupathi and Rudra (Voice over by Deepa Venkat
 Jagapathi Babu as Zamindar Kadhiresan
 Rajendra Prasad as Sivabalan
 Raadhika Sarathkumar as Aryamala
 Sunil Reddy as Rudra's brother
 Yogi Babu as Shanmugam 
 Vennela Kishore as Kishore
 Subbu Panchu as Sundar Raman
 Suresh Chandra Menon as Vikram
 Linga as Kathir
 Harshadaa Vijay as Geetha
 George Maryan as Bhaktavatsalam
 Jangiri Madhumitha as Thendral
 Chetan as Sundhar Pandiyan
 Devadarshini as Kumari
 Surekha Vani as Raghavi

Production 
Deepak Sundarrajan, son of director-actor R. Sundarrajan, who worked under the assistance of A. L. Vijay was reported to make his directorial debut with a film starring Remya Nambeesan and Natarajan Subramaniam, was announced in June 2017. But the project did not materialise due to various reasons. Three years later, in August 2020, he was reported to direct a horror comedy film, starring Taapsee Pannu and Vijay Sethupathi. It was her third Tamil film she signed after her prior commitments to Bollywood films, she made her return to Tamil cinema with Game Over (2019) and also signed Jana Gana Mana, which went on floors during late-2019. She was essayed to play a "street-smart woman", and the film featured an ensemble cast with popular comedians from South Indian cinema acting in pivotal roles. Yogi Babu and Radhika Sarathkumar reported to play pivotal roles in September 2020. Both the characters play dual roles in the film — one being featured in the period portion, and the other in the present timeline.

The film was initially titled as Annabelle Subramaniam and the principal photography began on 28 August 2020 in Jaipur. The film was entirely shot in a single schedule, following COVID-19 restrictions, and had also shot in City Palace, Rambagh Palace and Samode Palace for the past 20 days. It is the first Tamil film to be shot after 50 years, since Adimai Penn (1969), as other production teams found difficult to obtain permission to shoot the films in the palace. The team managed to complete the entire shoot, following the co-operation of the Rajasthan government and the authorities had provided hospitalities for the cast and crew members working in the film. The filmmakers wrapped the shoot within October 2020, and subsequently began post-production with the team had supervised extensive computer graphic works in the film. In August 2021, the makers announced the title changed as Annabelle Sethupathi, for the Tamil version, whilst the Hindi dubbed version was titled Annabelle Rathore.

Soundtrack 

The film's soundtrack and score is composed by newcomer Krishna Kishor. Before his debut as film music composer, Kishor worked as a percussionist for leading music composers including A. R. Rahman, Anirudh Ravichander, Hiphop Tamizha and Bollywood musicians. It was his second film he signed before Mughizh, a web-film which also starred and produced by Vijay Sethupathi and his first to be released.

The soundtrack album featured five songs written by Uma Devi, Vivek and Ku. Karthik. Singers Asees Kaur, Sanam Puri and Yashitha Sharma made their Tamil debut in playback singing, by providing vocals to one of the songs. The audio rights were acquired by Think Music. All the songs in the film were released as singles starting from 6 September 2021, with one song being released per day. The full album was unveiled along with the fifth song and two theme tracks in addition on 10 September 2021.

Release 
The film was released on Disney+ Hotstar on 17 September 2021 along with the Hindi dubbed version titled Annabelle Rathore.

Reception 

Ranjani Krishnakumar of Firstpost rated the film with 3/5 stars, stating that, "Annabelle Sethupathi could have been a lot more. With a little more complexity in screenplay and some wit in dialogue, the film could have been an absolute feast. Instead, Annabelle Sethupathi settles for being the lukewarm, saccharine tea that you politely drink because the host has made it with love." The Times of India gave a rating of 2.5 out on 5 and wrote, "A comedy with an interesting premise, but flat execution." Manoj Kumar of Indian Express rated the film with 2.5/5 stars, stating that, "Annabelle Sethupathi feels tolerable because of its self-aware nature and the way it subverts horror-comedy tropes." Haricharan Pudipeddi of Hindustan Times wrote, "Annabelle Sethupathi doesn’t try to stand out and there’s no need for it. It’s a film in which the influences are quite evident. It works better as a fantasy comedy and barely as a horror flick." Sudhir Srinivasan of The New Indian Express stated that, "The premise is interesting, but the pain is real." Praveen Sudevan of The Hindu wrote, "Vijay Sethupathi’s performance is the sole saving grace in Deepak Sundarrajan’s supernatural comedy." Bohni Bandyopadhyay of News 18 stated that, "Vijay Sethupathi and Taapsee Pannu starrer Annabelle Sethupathi will leave you baffled with its lack in logic and insane scripting." Sowmya Rajendran of The News Minute said, "Annabelle Sethupathi is neither funny nor scary. But the most horrifying fact comes at the end. Apparently, there is a Part 2 planned for this. Oh dear." Janani of India Today rated the film with 1.5/5 stars, and criticized "Many suggested that Annabelle Sethupathi could appeal to kids. But, when you have body-shaming jokes and outdated ideas, even kids won't be able to endure the film."

References

External links 
 

2020s Tamil-language films
2021 directorial debut films
Disney+ Hotstar original films
Indian comedy horror films